The Carbon Cut-Off Railway was a railroad line in the U.S. state of Wyoming.  In 1889 the Union Pacific Railroad invested $221,000 (equivalent to about $ today) to construct a rail line from Allen station on the main line (near Medicine Bow) to their coal mines near Hanna.  In 1892 the railroad operated  of track between Allen and Hanna and an additional  of track to the Hanna mine.

Later the UP abandoned its original main line between Allen and Dana, and now the Carbon Cut-Off Railway, along with a connection from Hanna to Dana, is part of the UP's Laramie Subdivision.

See also 
List of defunct Wyoming railroads

References 

Defunct Wyoming railroads
Predecessors of the Union Pacific Railroad
Railway companies established in 1889
1889 establishments in Wyoming Territory
Railroad cutoffs